Polymastia fusca is a species of sea sponge belonging to the family Polymastiidae. It is found in shallow subtidal habitats in the far north of North Island, New Zealand.

This firm-textured sponge grows up to 20 cm across, often encrusting its substrate. The outer layer is very dark brown, contrasting with a much paler yellow or orange interior. The whole surface is covered in papillae, those at the centre markedly taller than those at the periphery.

References

fusca
Sponges of New Zealand
Animals described in 1961
Taxa named by Patricia Bergquist